Maria Skyllas-Kazacos AM FTSE (born 26 October 1951) is an Australian chemical engineer best known for her pioneering work of the vanadium redox battery, which she created at the University of New South Wales in the 1980s. Her design used sulfuric acid electrolytes and was patented by the university. In 1999 she was appointed a Member of the Order of Australia "for service to science and technology, particularly in the development of the vanadium redox battery as an alternative power source".

She is an emeritus professor at the University of New South Wales.

Early life 
Skyllas-Kazacos was born as Maria Skyllas in Kalymnos, Greece, in 1951 and emigrated to Australia in 1954. She is the oldest of four siblings. She attended Fort Street Girls High School in Sydney, before beginning a degree in industrial chemistry at the University of New South Wales. She graduated with first class honours and the University Medal in 1974.

She completed her PhD in 1978 at the UNSW School of Chemical Technology on the topic of the electrochemistry of molten salts.

Career
After finishing her PhD, Skyllas received a CSIRO Postdoctoral Fellowship and joined Bell Laboratories in the US for her post-doctoral work.

While completing her postdoctoral fellowship at Bell Labs, Skyllas did research on solar energy and focused on the liquid junction solar cell. She researched ways of depositing thin films. She received a patent for a new method of electrodepositing thin films of cadmium selenide. Since Bell labs had to service Bell Telephone Company, Skyllas also did work on batteries. While assisting on experiments with a problem of lead-acid batteries, she discovered soluble lead(IV) ions in the charging and discharging reactions of the lead-acid batteries. She published a paper on this discovery in the Journal of the Electrochemical Society. After giving a poster presentation in Australia on the same subject, she was awarded the Bloom-Gutmann Prize for the best young author under 30.

After leaving Bell Labs, Skyllas went back to Australia and accepted a position as a Queen Elizabeth II Fellow in the School of Physics at the University of New South Wales. In 1982, aged 31, she became a professor in chemical engineering and industrial chemistry. Skyllas married Michael Kazacos, who is also a scientist, and they have three children.

At the University of New South Wales, Skyllas-Kazacos and her research team began working on vanadium compounds. She discovered that highly concentrated pentavalent solutions can be prepared indirectly from tetravalent ions, which is more soluble, combined with scraping of the carbon electrode that made the vanadium oxidation-reduction reactions reversible. Skyllas with her research team then patented the vanadium redox battery in 1988.

Awards 
Source: 
 Whiffen Medal, Institution of Chemical Engineers Australia, 1997
 CHEMECA Medal, Institution of Chemical Engineers Australia, 1998
 Member of the Order of Australia, Australia Day Honours List, 1999
 R.K. Murphy Medal, Royal Australian Chemical Institute, 2000
 Recipient, Distinguished Lecturer Award, Pacific Northwest National Laboratories, Richland, US, 2009
 Co-Recipient, Light Metals Division Journal of Metals Best Paper Award, 2009
 Invested as Grand Lady of the Byzantine Order of St Eugene of Trebizond, Australia Day, 2009
 Castner Medal, Society for the Chemical Industry, UK, 2011
 Fellow of the Australian Academy of Technological Sciences and Engineering, 2014

References 

Australian women chemists
Australian women engineers
Members of the Order of Australia
Australian chemical engineers
Australian people of Greek descent
1951 births
Living people
Fellows of the Australian Academy of Technological Sciences and Engineering
21st-century women engineers
Chemical engineering academics